Ronald Leland Bohm (born September 3, 1964) is a former American football defensive tackle who played one season for the St. Louis Cardinals. He was a replacement player.

References

External links
 Ron Bohm College Stats
 Ron Bohm | Combine Results | DT - Illinois

1964 births
Living people
St. Louis Cardinals (football) players
American football defensive tackles
Illinois Fighting Illini football players
National Football League replacement players